Nina Quezada Bloomgarden (born February 2, 1998) is an American actress. Her grandfather was theatre producer Kermit Bloomgarden.

Career 
In 2021, Bloomgarden could be seen with Kevin Hart in Fatherhood and in 2022, Bloomgarden appeared in Good Girl Jane alongside Andi MacDowell. In the 2022 Peacock television series The Resort, Bloomgarden plays Violet Thompson a tourist who disappeared in 2007 on holiday with her dad played by Nick Offerman, with her disappearance investigated 15 years later by Cristin Milioti and William Jackson Harper. Bloomgarden suggested she used her memories of the loss of her own father a shortly before her audition for the role for some of the more emotional scenes in the production and to empathise with the character who had lost her mother. On set she described how she and co-star Skyler Gisondo were able to throw ideas around and improvise a little with the blessing of show creator Andy Siara. Bloomgarden described the familial atmosphere of filming in Puerto Rico saying they were like one big "TV family". Bloomgarden told Grazia magazine that The Resort is “Jurassic Park meets the Twilight Zone” and said the complexity of the story “drew me in”. Bloomgarden also completed principal photography, for a planned 2022 release, for the film Jane alongside Madelaine Petsch, Chloe Bailey and Melissa Leo.

Personal life 
Nina Bloomgarden is the granddaughter of Kermit Bloomgarden. She was born and raised in New York before studying acting at Royal Welsh College of Music & Drama.

Filmography

Film

Television

References

External links 

Living people
1998 births
Actresses from New York City
Alumni of the Royal Welsh College of Music & Drama